Kahutoi Mere Te Kanawa (born 1960) is a New Zealand Māori university teacher, curator, weaver and textile artist. Her works have been collected and displayed both nationally and internationally. She has worked as a senior lecturer at the University of Otago and a curator at the Auckland War Memorial Museum. Te Kanawa is member of the Auckland War Memorial Museum Te Awa project team. This project uses the expertise of Māori specialists such as Te Kanawa to enrich the information on Māori taonga in the collection of the Museum.

Family 
Te Kanawa is the sister of Rangi Te Kanawa, daughter of Diggeress Te Kanawa and granddaughter of Dame Rangimārie Hetet.

Selected publications 

 Smith, C. A., White, M., & Te Kanawa, K. (2011). The preservation of Māori textiles: Collaboration, research and cultural meaning. In Cultural Heritage/Cultural Identity–The Role of Conservation. Preprints of the 16th Triennial ICOM-CC Conference.
 Te Kanawa, K., (2009) Toi Maramatanga: a visual Māori art expression of meaning. Master of Arts thesis, Auckland University of Technology, Auckland.
 Te Kanawa, K. (2006). Mai i te ao kohatu: weaving – an artform derived from mātauranga Māori as a gift from the ancestors. In Turoua Ngā Whetū Research Colloquium. Te Tumu – School of Māori, Pacific and Indigenous Studies, University of Otago, Dunedin.
 Wood, B., Henare, A., Lander, M., and Te Kanawa, K. (2003). Visiting the house of gifts: the 1998 ‘Maori’ exhibition at the British Museum. Journal of New Zealand Literature 21: 83–101.

References 

New Zealand curators
Living people
New Zealand Māori artists
New Zealand Māori weavers
Ngāti Maniapoto people
Women textile artists
Place of birth missing (living people)
Date of birth missing (living people)
New Zealand women curators
1960 births